Abdul Manan bin Ismail (28 June 1948 – 12 February 2018) was a Malaysian politician. He was the Member of Parliament for the Paya Besar constituency in Pahang. He is a member of the United Malays National Organisation (UMNO) major component party in the previous governing Barisan Nasional (BN) coalition.

Abdul Manan served was a long-serving private secretary to Najib Razak while the latter was a federal minister. In 2004 general election, he was elected to the Pahang State Legislative Assembly, representing the constituency of Panching.

In the 2008 general election, Abdul Manan contested the Paya Besar parliamentary constituency, replacing former government minister Siti Zaharah Sulaiman as UMNO's nominee for the seat. Abdul Manan won the seat, defeating Mohd Jafri Ab Rashid of the People's Justice Party (PKR) by an 8,503 majority. In 2010 he was appointed chairman of the Intellectual Property Corporation of Malaysia, and in 2013 general election he retained his parliamentary seat with a margin of 7,715 votes.

Death
Abdul Manan died on February 12, 2018, at the age of 69 of suspected heart attack after falling in a bathroom.

Election results
{| class="wikitable" style="margin:0.5em ; font-size:95%"
|+ Pahang State Legislative Assembly
!|Year
!|Constituency
!colspan=2|Candidate
!|Votes
!|Pct
!colspan=2|Opponent(s)
!|Votes
!|Pct
!|Ballot casts
!|Majority
!|Turnout
|-
|2004
|N19 Panching
| |
| (UMNO)
|7,527
|66.57%| |
|Yusof Embong (PAS)
|3,780
|33.43%
|11,487
|3,747
|79.00%
|}

Honours
  :
 Knight Companion of the Order of the Crown of Pahang (DIMP) – Dato' (1999)
  Knight Companion of the Order of Sultan Ahmad Shah of Pahang (DSAP) – Dato' (2013)
  Grand Knight of the Order of Sultan Ahmad Shah of Pahang (SSAP) – Dato' Sri''' (2015)

References

1948 births
2018 deaths
People from Pahang
Malaysian people of Malay descent
Malaysian Muslims
United Malays National Organisation politicians
Members of the Pahang State Legislative Assembly
Members of the Dewan Rakyat
Accidental deaths from falls
Accidental deaths in Malaysia